Michael Lin may refer to:

 Michael Lin (mathematician) (born 1942), Israeli mathematician
 Michael Lin (artist) (born 1964), Taiwanese artist
 Michael Z. Lin (born 1973), Taiwanese-American scientist